"Reasons" is a song written by Sam See recorded by Australian singer John Farnham. The song was released as the fourth and final single from his album Whispering Jack (1986).

Track listing
 "Reasons" - 4:23
 "One Step Away" - 3:35

Charts

References

1987 singles
1986 songs
John Farnham songs
Sony BMG singles